Rushinga is one of seven districts in the Mashonaland Central province of Zimbabwe.

See also
 Rushinga (Senatorial constituency)

References

Districts of Mashonaland Central Province